Pend Oreille may refer to:
 Lake Pend Oreille, the largest lake in the northern Idaho Panhandle
 Pend Oreille County, Washington, a county located in the northeastern section of the State of Washington
 Pend Oreille River, a tributary of the Columbia River
 Pend d'Oreilles tribe,  an Indigenous peoples of the Northwest Plateau
 Pend Oreille Valley Railroad, a shortline railroad located in Usk, in northeast Washington

See also
 Oreille (disambiguation)